is a Japanese former swimmer who competed in the 1984 Summer Olympics.

References

1967 births
Living people
Japanese female freestyle swimmers
Olympic swimmers of Japan
Swimmers at the 1984 Summer Olympics
Place of birth missing (living people)
Asian Games medalists in swimming
Swimmers at the 1982 Asian Games
Asian Games silver medalists for Japan
Medalists at the 1982 Asian Games